The 1923 season was Wisła Krakóws 15th year as a club.

Friendlies

A-Klasa

League standings

Mistrzostwa Polski

Squad, appearances and goals

|-
|}

Goalscorers

Disciplinary record

External links
1923 Wisła Kraków season at historiawisly.pl

Wisła Kraków seasons
Association football clubs 1923 season
Wisla